Adkin is an English surname. Notable people with the surname include:

George Leslie Adkin (1888–1964), New Zealand farmer, geologist, archaeologist and photographer
William Adkin (born 1990), English cricketer

See also
Adkins

English-language surnames